Shaolin Soccer is a 2001 Hong Kong sports comedy film directed by Stephen Chow, who also stars in the lead role. The film revolves around a former Shaolin monk who reunites his five brothers, years after their master's death, to apply their superhuman martial arts skills to play soccer and bring Shaolin kung fu to the masses.

Plot
Sing is a master of Shaolin kung fu, whose goal in life is to promote the spiritual and practical benefits of the martial art to modern society. He experiments with various methods, but none bear positive results. He then meets "Golden Leg" Fung; a legendary Hong Kong soccer star in his day, who is now walking with a limp, following the betrayal of a former teammate, Hung, now a rich businessman. Sing explains his desires to Fung, who in turn offers his services to coach Sing in soccer. Sing is compelled by the idea of promoting kung fu through soccer, and agrees to enlist his former Shaolin brothers to form a team under Fung's management. Sing and Fung attempt to put together an unbeatable soccer team. After some failed attempts, Sing's brothers all agree to participate in the team. Fung invites a vicious team to play against them for a scrimmage, and the thugs proceed to give the Shaolin Team a literal beating. When all seems lost, the Shaolin disciples reawaken and utilize their special powers, dismantling the other team's rough play easily. The thugs then give up and ask to join Sing's team.

Sing meets Mui, a baker with severe acne who uses Tai chi to bake mantou. He takes her to look at very expensive dresses at a high-end department store after hours. She soon forms an attachment to Sing and even gets a makeover in an attempt to impress him. However, this backfires and when Mui reveals her feelings to him: he tells her he only wants to be her friend. This revelation, coupled with the constant bullying from her overbearing boss, leads Mui to disappear.

Team Shaolin enters the open cup competition in Hong Kong, where they chalk up consecutive and often ridiculously one-sided victories due to their special Shaolin techniques. They end up meeting Team Evil in the final, owned by none other than Hung. Team Evil had been injected with an American drug, granting them superhuman strength and speed, making them practically invincible, and they bring Team Shaolin back to reality when Team Evil's amazing capabilities prove more than a match for them. After Team Evil takes out Team Shaolin's two goalkeepers, Mui, who has shaved her hair and improved her face, reappears to be a goalkeeper for Team Shaolin.

In their final attack, Team Evil's striker leaps into the sky and kicks the ball with enormous force towards Mui, who prevents him from scoring with her tai chi. Mui and Sing combine their martial arts skills and rocket the ball downfield. The ball plows through Team Evil's goal post, thereby scoring the winning goal. Sing is then thrown into the air in celebration as the trophy is presented to him and his team.

A newspaper article then shows Hung being stripped of his title of soccer chairman and sentenced to jail for five years, while the players of Team Evil are permanently banned from playing soccer professionally. Sing goes out for a morning jog and feels joy at seeing the people around him practicing Kung Fu and implementing it into their daily lives, his lifelong dream having become a reality. The camera pans to a large poster of Sing and Mui, who have since married and became famous for winning a world championship in bowling, among other things.

Cast
 Stephen Chow as Sing / Mighty Steel Leg (#10):A Shaolin kung fu practitioner and former monk who wants to promote the martial arts form to the world. He is the team's striker and uses his extremely powerful legs to produce unstoppable soccer shots.
 Ng Man-tat as Fung / Golden Leg:A homeless man and former soccer player from the 1980s who became crippled after being beaten by an angry mob after a match, which he deliberately lost after taking a bribe from Hung, the coach of Team Evil.
 Wong Yat-fei as Iron Head (#11):The eldest of the Shaolin monk brothers, who is now working in a club. His style of kung fu utilizes his immensely hard head, and he specializes in headers during matches.
 Mok Mei-lam as Hooking Leg (#2):The second eldest of the Shaolin monk brothers, who is now working as a dishwasher. As the team's full-back, Hooking Leg's Shaolin skills resemble ground tumbling boxing, which he uses to keep the ball away from the opponent and confuse them.
 Tin Kai-man as Iron Shirt (#3):The third of the Shaolin monk brothers, who is now working as a businessman. As the team's full-back, Iron Shirt can absorb blunt force attacks without injuries, as well as hold and propel the ball with his abdomen.
 Danny Chan Kwok-kwan as Empty Hand / Lightning Hand (#1):The fourth of the Shaolin monk brothers, who is now unemployed and job-hunting. Empty Hand resembles Bruce Lee to the point of wearing his yellow and black jumpsuit from Game of Death. As the team's goalkeeper, his fast hands and powerful arms allow him to instantly and accurately catch objects thrown at him.
 Lam Chi-chung as Light Weight Vest (#6):The sixth and youngest of the Shaolin monk brothers, who has become obese and gluttonous after being diagnosed with a pituitary disease. He is the team's winger. Despite his illness, he is capable of utilizing his style of kung fu to leap incredible heights, giving the illusion of flight.
 Zhao Wei as Mui:A baker and Sing's love interest, who is skilled at manipulating objects with tai chi. She rarely speaks Cantonese, but everyone else still understands her and vice versa.
 Patrick Tse as Hung:The coach of Team Evil and Fung's former teammate, who has maintained a rivalry with Fung after forcing him to take a bribe during a match in the 1980s.
 Shik Zi-yun as Team Evil's striker (#9), who can back flip and soar into the sky to kick a fiery ball to its target.
 Cao Hua as Team Evil's goalkeeper (#21), who can guard his goalpost with one hand in his pocket. His incredibly strong hands can crush a thick metal crossbar.
 Cecilia Cheung and Karen Mok as Team Dragon players #7 & #11, who can run so fast that they appear to be inches above the ground. 
 Fung Min-hun as the captain of Team Rebellion, a vicious mobster who wields a crescent wrench and steel mallet as weapons. 
 Vincent Kok as the captain of Team Tofu, the team that Team Shaolin faces in the preliminary match.

Production

Inspiration
The inspiration for Shaolin Soccer came from Chow wanting a unique premise for a martial arts action film. According to an interview with Premiere Magazine, Chow stated,

Chow had intended for this film to appeal to a global audience, stating, "I can't rely on the local market, because it's too small, so since Shaolin Soccer it's always my ambition to go international".

Casting
Apart from several veteran actors, Chow stated in an interview with Premiere magazine that he cast several people in his entourage who had no prior acting experience before Shaolin Soccer. For example, Lam Chi Chung (Light Weight) had worked as Chow's screenwriter and Danny Chan Kwok-kwan (Empty Hand) was the dance choreographer hired to design the "Michael Jackson dance number" that followed Sing and Mui's first meeting early in the film. Chow comments he made Chan wear Bruce Lee's yellow-and-black tracksuit because only the goalkeeper "can wear a special uniform." Tin Kai-man (Iron Shirt) had been Chow's production manager on several movies, but had acted in numerous minor roles in previous films. For instance, he played a young wanna-be Triad member in Chow's preceding movie, King of Comedy. Cecilia Cheung and Karen Mok, who briefly appear as Team Dragon Players 7 & 11 in Shaolin Soccer, had major roles in King of Comedy. Chow defends his decision to hire non-actors, saying, "In terms of finding talent, I try to bring out the funniest thing I notice about them during casting, if it made us laugh at the casting, it will also do on the big screen."

Zhao Wei, who played the Mandarin-speaking Mui, said it was a different step for her to star in a Hong Kong production. However, Zhao admitted that she was not impressed with her look with less makeup because she is easily recognisable for her beautiful appearance.

Three of the principal cast members appeared in Chow's Kung Fu Hustle: Danny Chan Kwok-kwan (Empty Hand) portrayed Brother Sum, boss of the "Axe Gang"; Tin Kai-man (Iron Shirt) portrayed the loud-mouthed advisor of Brother Sum; and Lam Chi-chung (Light Weight) portrayed Bone, Chow's sidekick and partner in petty crime. Fung Min-hun (Team Rebellion Captain) briefly appeared as Cecilia Cheung's abusive boyfriend in King of Comedy and the Four Eyes Clerk who beats up both Sing and Bone when they make fun of him on the bus in Kung Fu Hustle.

Home media
In Hong Kong, the film was released on DVD and Video CD on 14 September 2001. The DVD release was shortened by 10 minutes, with the option for viewers to access the deleted scenes in the middle of the film. The scenes deleted from the DVD version are the dance sequence in front of Mui's bakery, much of the conversation over Mui's makeover and the blooper reel before the end credits. Viewers can also access the making of key special effects scenes as well.

The film was also released in UMD format for the Sony PSP on 23 December 2005.

The 2004 US DVD release by Miramax Films deleted 23 minutes of footage from the original cut; the omitted footage includes "Golden Leg" Fung's flashback opening sequence and Sing's interactions with Mui. This version features an English dub with Chow dubbing his own voice and Bai Ling as the voice of Mui. In addition, the DVD gives viewers the option to play the original Hong Kong version.

In the UK, the film was released on Blu-ray by Optimum Releasing on 26 January 2010.

The Japanese version of the film was released by Pioneer LDC on 22 November 2002. It was reissued by The Clockworks Group on 21 December 2003.

The Italian dub of the film features the voices of professional footballers Damiano Tommasi (as Mighty Steel Leg Sing), Vincent Candela (as Empty Hand), Marco Delvecchio (as Iron Head), Siniša Mihajlović (as Hooking Leg), Giuseppe Pancaro (as Iron Shirt) and Angelo Peruzzi (as Light Weight Vest).

Reception

Box office
At the Hong Kong box office, Shaolin Soccer grossed HK$60,739,847, making it the highest-grossing film in the region's history at the time. It held the record until 2004 when it was topped by Stephen Chow's next feature Kung Fu Hustle. Shaolin Soccer earned a worldwide gross of US$42,776,760.

Critical response
On Rotten Tomatoes, the film has a 90% approval rating based on 93 reviews; the average rating is 7.10/10. The site's critical consensus reads: "The plot is utterly ridiculous, and the soccer in the movie is unlike any ever played anywhere on Earth, but watching Shaolin Soccer, you will probably find it impossible to care." On Metacritic, the film has a score of 68 out of 100 based on 24 critics, indicating "generally favorable reviews."

China ban
China's State Administration of Radio, Film and TV rejected Shaolin Soccer from theatrical and DVD/VCD release, because Stephen Chow did not apply for Chinese permission for public screenings in Hong Kong.

Accolades

Media adaptations

Comic books

Chinese
The first of a four volume Shaolin Soccer manhua was published in Hong Kong roughly nine months after the film originally premiered in 2001. The characters were drawn with large manga-like eyes and cartoonish bodies, but the artists were careful to retain the likenesses of each actor who portrayed them.

American
ComicsOne approached noted comic book artist Andy Seto with the idea of creating a two volume manhua-style graphic novel adaptation of the feature film. Seto attached himself to the project because the film was very popular and, therefore, had "a certain level of marketing value". The project was officially announced on 30 June 2003 and the release of vol. 1 was scheduled to coincide with the film's US premiere in August, but the film was pushed back. The Miramax film corporation bought the American film rights to Shaolin Soccer before its release in China, so they helped publish the comic book along with two Chinese film companies who originally produced the film. Volumes 1 and 2 were released in August and November 2003 and sold for US$13.95 each. Their suggested reading level was age 13 and above.

Seto worked to make the novel as faithful to the film as possible but he admits that Stephen Chow's brand of Mo lei tau comedy does not translate well into illustrations. He stated in an interview that "the Shaolin Soccer comic is 80% movie adaptation with 20% new content." This new content includes a backstory about Steel Leg's training in Shaolin before the death of his master, as well as completely rewriting entire sections of the movie. For example, in the film a group of bar thugs beat up Sing and Iron Head after listening to their lounge-style tribute to Shaolin kung fu. The following day, Sing seeks out the group and uses his Shaolin skills to beat the thugs using a soccer ball. Fung sees the brawl and comes up with the idea of fusing kung fu and soccer. However, in the comic book, Sing is meditating in the park when he gets hit in the head with a soccer ball. The cocky players mock him and destroy a stone statue of his deceased master. Sing proceeds to use the soccer ball as a weapon.

Another example is the fact the characters are visually different from the film. All of their comic book personas look to be in their twenties to thirties, with highly toned athletic physiques (with the exception of Light Weight); even Iron Head, who was the eldest of the six brothers, appears younger than he should.

Several online reviews have criticised the American adaptation for its apparent lack of story line coherence, mixture of realistic and cartoonish drawing styles, and bad Chinese-to-English translation, among other issues. In regards to the translation, one reviewer stated, "It's almost as if the book was translated with a first-year English student referencing a Chinese-to-English dictionary, with strangely assembled sentences and strange bursts of dialogue peppering the pages." Another common complaint was that the comics seemed to be geared towards those people who had previously seen the movie. Without this familiarity, a newcomer would lose track of the storyline because of the overcrowded pages and rapidly shifting plot.

Legacy
 Stephen Chow produced Shaolin Girl, a Japanese film inspired by Shaolin Soccer.
 Michael Dante DiMartino and Bryan Konietzko, co-creators of the Avatar: The Last Airbender animated television series, stated in an interview that "Shaolin Soccer is one of our favorite movies. It has tons of fantastic action and lots of funny moments. Some of the effects provided inspiration for how bending (the art of controlling the elements) might look on the show."
 One episode of Keroro Gunso had a soccer theme which parodied this movie.
 The music video for the American R&B singer-songwriter and rapper Lumidee's song "Dance" launched and the 2006 FIFA World Cup album soundtrack has scenes of the movie.
 A clip of Shaolin Soccer was played on the big screen of the venue before the match Ivory Coast vs Serbia and Montenegro in 2006 FIFA World Cup.

See also

 Four Oddballs of Saigon
 Shaolin Girl, a film inspired by Shaolin Soccer

Notes

References

Further reading

External links
 
 
 
 
 

2001 films
2001 comedy films
2001 martial arts films
2000s action comedy films
2000s martial arts comedy films
2000s sports comedy films
Hong Kong action comedy films
Hong Kong martial arts comedy films
2000s Cantonese-language films
Association football films
Best Film HKFA
Films adapted into comics
Films directed by Stephen Chow
Films set in Shanghai
Films shot in Shanghai
Martial arts fantasy films
2000s Hong Kong films